Aydın Karabulut (born 25 January 1988) is a Turkish footballer who last played as an attacking midfielder for Ankaraspor.

Career
Aydın had started his career in Hertha Berlin, one of the leading teams in German capital where he was born. After a while, he pulled the attention of Turkish national team scouts as a promising starlet. He had 5 caps for U-19 national team. He joined Beşiktaş January 2006. His contract came into force on 8 February 2006 which will expire in May 2010. Aydın had several recent occasions on Süper Lig in first season mostly as a substitute player.

On 16 February 2008, he was on the line-up of team up against Ankaraspor where Aydın assisted Nobre by his corner kick. Subsequently, he tried to find the net by his own again with a corner kick, however he was denied by the opponent keeper Senecký after his direct curving shoot. He scored his first ever goal for Beşiktaş on 5 January 2008 in Fortis Turkey Cup group match against Diyarbakır BŞB. Aydın kept playing as a substitute player for his team and scored his very first goal in Turkish League on a crucial encounter against Trabzonspor.

Aydın has joined capital city team Ankaraspor in summer 2009, in return of Erhan Güven, who joined Beşiktaş as the new defender.

On 6 September 2013, Karabulut left Elazığspor and joined fellow Super Lig side Sivasspor. During the transfer window of the 2014–2015 season, he signed for Bursaspor.

References

External links
 
 
 

1988 births
Living people
Turkish footballers
Turkey under-21 international footballers
Turkey youth international footballers
German footballers
Beşiktaş J.K. footballers
MKE Ankaragücü footballers
Ankaraspor footballers
Kardemir Karabükspor footballers
Süper Lig players
German people of Turkish descent
Göztepe S.K. footballers
Elazığspor footballers
Sivasspor footballers
Gençlerbirliği S.K. footballers
Association football wingers
Footballers from Berlin